Nupserha malaisei is a species of beetle in the family Cerambycidae. It was described by Stephan von Breuning in 1949.

References

malaisei
Beetles described in 1949